Čelkova Lehota is a village and municipality in Považská Bystrica District in the Trenčín Region of north-western Slovakia.

The village lies in a beautiful natural environment near Strážovské vrchy mountain range at the end of Domaniža valley.

History
In historical records the village was first mentioned in 1471.

Geography
The municipality lies at an altitude of 445 metres and covers an area of 3.705 km2. It has a population of about 146 people.

Genealogical resources

The records for genealogical research are available at the state archive "Statny Archiv in Bytca, Slovakia"

 Roman Catholic church records (births/marriages/deaths): 1670-1894 (parish B)

See also 
 Čelko
 List of municipalities and towns in Slovakia

References

External links

http://www.statistics.sk/mosmis/eng/run.html
Surnames of living people in Celkova Lehota

Villages and municipalities in Považská Bystrica District